The Board of Studies, Teaching and Educational Standards NSW (abbreviated as BOSTES) was the state government education agency in New South Wales, Australia. It was formed on 1 January 2014 following the amalgamation of the Board of Studies and the NSW Institute of Teachers, and replaced on 1 January 2017 by the New South Wales Education Standards Authority.

BOSTES was responsible for:
 the accreditation of all teachers at all levels
 the endorsement of teachers’ professional learning
 the accreditation of initial teacher education degrees 
 establishing professional teaching standards.
 curriculum from kindergarten to initial teacher education
 examinations (including the NSW Higher School Certificate (HSC) and the AMEB NSW)
 the registration of non-government schools and home schooling
 the regulation of school providers of courses to overseas students

BOSTES was also accredited by the Australian Curriculum, Assessment and Reporting Authority as the NSW test administration authority for NAPLAN.

BOSTES was responsible for awarding the secondary school credentials Record of School Achievement and HSC.

References

External links 

Education in New South Wales
Government agencies of New South Wales
2014 establishments in Australia
2016 disestablishments in Australia